

Active duty
Source:
4th Tactical Fighter Wing, Seymour Johnson AFB 
333d Tactical Fighter Squadron 1960–1970
334th Tactical Fighter Squadron 1959–1966
335th Tactical Fighter Squadron 1959–1966
336th Tactical Fighter Squadron 1959–1966
8th Tactical Fighter Wing, Itazuke AB
35th Tactical Fighter Squadron 1963–1967 
36th Tactical Fighter Squadron 1963–1967
80th Tactical Fighter Squadron 1963–1967
18th Tactical Fighter Wing, Kadena AB
12th Tactical Fighter Squadron 1962–1972
44th Tactical Fighter Squadron 1963–1970
67th Tactical Fighter Squadron 1962–1967
23d Tactical Fighter Wing, McConnell AFB
560th Tactical Fighter Squadron 1963–1968
561st Tactical Fighter Squadron 1963–1978
562d Tactical Fighter Squadron 1963–1980
563d Tactical Fighter Squadron 1963–1972
36th Tactical Fighter Wing, Bitburg AB
22d Tactical Fighter Squadron 1961–1966
23d Tactical Fighter Squadron 1961–1966
53d Tactical Fighter Squadron 1961–1966
49th Tactical Fighter Wing, Spangdahlem AB
7th Tactical Fighter Squadron 1962–1966
8th Tactical Fighter Squadron 1962–1967
9th Tactical Fighter Squadron 1962–1967
355th Tactical Fighter Wing, McConnell AFB
354th Tactical Fighter Squadron 1962–1965
357th Tactical Fighter Squadron 1964–1966
421st Tactical Fighter Squadron 1962–1965
469th Tactical Fighter Squadron 1964–1965
355th Tactical Fighter Wing, Takhli RTAFB
333rd Tactical Fighter Squadron 1965–1970
354th Tactical Fighter Squadron 1965–1970
357th Tactical Fighter Squadron 1966–1970
388th Tactical Fighter Wing, Korat RTAFB
13th Tactical Fighter Squadron 1966–1967
17th Wild Weasel Squadron 1971–1974
34th Tactical Fighter Squadron 1966–1969
6010th Wild Weasel Squadron 1970–1971
United States Air Force Thunderbirds, Nellis Air Force Base 1963-1964

Air National Guard

Air Force Reserve

See also
 F-105 Thunderchief
 List of surviving Republic F-105 Thunderchiefs
 Wild Weasel

References

United States military aircraft
Military units and formations of the United States Air Force by equipment